Sergiy Volodymyrovych Kulyk (born August 5, 1958) is a Ukrainian diplomat. He has held the positions of Chargé d'affaires of Ukraine in the United States (1992) and Coordinator of the World Bank on the African continent as a Country Program Coordinator for Ghana, Liberia, and Sierra Leone, AFC.

Education 

Kulyk holds a degree in International Economics. In 2001, he completed the Executive Development Program at Harvard University.

Career 
In 1982 he worked as second secretary of the Ministry of Foreign Affairs of the Ukrainian SSR, was an expert delegation on Ukrainian SSR XXXVII General Assembly of the United Nations.

He worked as first secretary of the Permanent Mission of Ukraine to the UN.

From 01.1992 to 12.1992 – Chargé d'affaires of Ukraine in the United States.

Since 1993 he joined the World Bank. He worked positions in the Europe and Central Asia department as a Resident Representative in Belarus, Moldova and Ukraine, the Lead Country Officer and Country Program Coordinator.

Since 2009 he works Coordinator of the World Bank on the African continentin as a Country Program Coordinator for countries Ghana, Liberia and Sierra Leone.

See also
 Embassy of Ukraine, Washington, D.C.

References

External links
 Embassy of Ukraine in the United States of America
  The World Bank 

Living people
1958 births
Diplomats from Kyiv
Ambassadors of Ukraine to the United States
World Bank people
Soviet officials of the United Nations
Ukrainian officials of the United Nations